The National League Knockout Cup is a speedway third tier Knockout Cup competition in the United Kingdom.

The competition was previously known as the Academy League Knockout Cup (1995) and the Conference League Knockout Cup (1996-2008) until it changed name to the National League Knockout Cup.

The 2020 and 2021 editions of the Cup were cancelled due to the COVID-19 pandemic.

Winners

See also
 Knockout Cup (speedway) for full list of winners and competitions

References

Speedway competitions in the United Kingdom
Recurring sporting events established in 1995
1995 establishments in the United Kingdom